The 2017–18 EHF Champions League was the 25th edition of Europe's premier club handball tournament.

Győri Audi ETO KC defended their title by defeating HC Vardar in the final.

Competition format
16 teams participated in the competition, divided in four groups who played in a round robin, home and away format. The top three teams in each group qualified for the main round

Main round
The 12 qualified teams were divided in four groups who played in a round robin, home and away format. The points gained against the qualified teams in the first round were carried over. The top four teams in each group qualified for the quarterfinals.

Knockout stage
After the quarterfinals, the culmination of the season, the WOMEN'S EHF FINAL4, will continue in its existing format, with the four top teams from the competition competing for the title.

Team allocation
14 teams were directly qualified for the group stage.

Round and draw dates
The qualification draw was held in Vienna, Austria, the group stage draw in Ljubljana, Slovenia and the final four draw in Budapest, Hungary.

Qualification stage

The draw was held on 29 June 2017. The two winners of the qualification tournaments advanced to the group stage.

Qualification tournament 1

Qualification tournament 2

Group stage

The draw was held on 30 June 2017.

In each group, teams played against each other in a double round-robin format, with home and away matches.

Group A

Group B

Group C

Group D

Main round

The top three teams of each preliminary group advance. Points obtained against qualified teams from the same group are carried over.

In each group, teams play against each other in a double round-robin format, with home and away matches.

Group 1

Group 2

Knockout stage

The first four placed teams from the main round qualified for the knockout stage.

Quarterfinals

Final four

Final

Awards and statistics

All-Star Team
The all-star team and awards were announced on 11 May 2018.

Goalkeeper: 
Right wing: 
Right back: 
Centre back: 
Left back: 
Left wing: 
Pivot:

Other awards
MVP of the Final Four:
Best coach: 
Best young player: 
Best defence player:

Top goalscorers

References

External links
Official website

 
2017
2017 in European sport
2018 in European sport
2017 in women's handball
2018 in women's handball